Mount Charvin (2,409 m) is a mountain in the Aravis Range in Savoie, France.

Mountains of the Alps
Mountains of Savoie
Mountains of Haute-Savoie